Lamine Diawara is a Malian former professional footballer who played as a midfielder for Esteghlal Khuzestan in the Iran Pro League.

International career
In January 2014, coach Djibril Dramé, invited him to be a part of the Mali squad for the 2014 African Nations Championship. He helped the team to the quarter finals where they lost to Zimbabwe by two goals to one.

References

Living people
Mali international footballers
Malian footballers
Malian expatriate sportspeople in Oman
2014 African Nations Championship players
1986 births
Stade Malien players
Malian expatriate footballers
Expatriate footballers in Iran
Esteghlal Khuzestan players
Association football midfielders
21st-century Malian people
Mali A' international footballers
Malian expatriate sportspeople in Iran
Expatriate footballers in Oman
Al-Nasr SC (Salalah) players